The Spokane Bunchgrassers were a Minor League Baseball team in the Pacific Northwest League. They were located in Spokane, Washington and played at the Northwest League Grounds. They won the first ever Pacific Northwest League Championship.

Year-by-year record

Notable players
Ollie Beard
Jack Brennan
Abner Dalrymple
Lefty Marr
Harry Raymond
Phil Reccius
John Sowders
Joe Strauss

External links

Sports in Spokane, Washington
Defunct baseball teams in Washington (state)
Professional baseball teams in Washington (state)
1890 establishments in Washington (state)
Baseball teams established in 1890
1892 disestablishments in Washington (state)
Sports clubs disestablished in 1892
Baseball teams disestablished in 1892